Alena Prosková, married Plischkeová (born 29 April 1948) is a Czech athlete. She competed for Czechoslovakia in the women's high jump at the 1972 Summer Olympics.

Her daughter Sylvia Plischke was a professional tennis player.

References

External links
 
 

1948 births
Living people
Athletes (track and field) at the 1972 Summer Olympics
Czech female high jumpers
Olympic athletes of Czechoslovakia
Sportspeople from Plzeň